Kiryl Radzivonaw (born 9 May 2000) is a Belarusian professional footballer who plays for Isloch Minsk Raion on loan from Dinamo Minsk.

References

External links 
 
 
 Profile at Dinamo Minsk website

2000 births
Living people
Belarusian footballers
Association football defenders
FC Dinamo Minsk players
FC Smolevichi players
FC Belshina Bobruisk players
FC Isloch Minsk Raion players